Cookies and cream is an ice cream variety consisting of chocolate cookies in sweet cream or vanilla ice cream.

Cookies and cream may also refer to:

 Hershey's Cookies 'n' Creme, a candy bar
 Cookies & Cream (film), 2008
 Cookies 'n Cream (album), 2012, by Blanco and Yukmouth
 Cookie and Cream, the title characters of the Nintendo DS game, The Adventures of Cookie & Cream